Rhamphomyia lamellata is a species of dance flies, in the fly family Empididae. It is included in the subgenus Holoclera of the genus Rhamphomyia. It is found in Great Britain and Ireland, Germany, Switzerland, the Czech Republic, Slovakia and Hungary.

References

External links
Fauna Europaea

Rhamphomyia
Asilomorph flies of Europe
Insects described in 1926